Rockford High School may mean:

 Rockford Central High School, a former high school from 1885 until 1940 in Rockford, Winnebago County, Illinois — known as Rockford High School when in operation
 One of the other four secondary public schools of Rockford, Illinois
 Rockford Junior/Senior High School, in Rudd-Rockford-Marble Rock Community School District, Floyd County, Iowa — uses the team name the Warriors, and also known as Rockford Middle-Senior High School
 Rockford High School (Michigan) in Kent County, Michigan — uses the team name the Rams
 Rockford High School (Minnesota) in Hennepin County, Minnesota — uses the team name the Rockets